Lake Nerpichye may refer to the following lakes in Russia:

Lake Nerpichye (Kamchatka Krai)
Lake Nerpichye (Sakha Republic)